Nový Oldřichov (until 1950 Oldřichov u České Lípy) is a municipality and village in Česká Lípa District in the Liberec Region of the Czech Republic. It has about 800 inhabitants.

Administrative parts
The village of Mistrovice is an administrative part of Nový Oldřichov.

References

Villages in Česká Lípa District
Lusatian Mountains